Deokjong of Goryeo (9 June 1016 – 31 October 1034) (r. 1031–1034) was the 9th ruler of the Goryeo dynasty of Korea.  The son of Hyeonjong, he was confirmed as Crown Prince in 1022.  During his reign, the national histories begun under his father were completed, and the construction of the long Cheolli Jangseong wall began.

After ascending the throne in 1031, Deokjong requested that the Khitan return their Goryeo prisoners and pull back from the Yalu River. After this request was refused, he turned to fortifying the northern frontier.

Family
Father: Hyeonjong of Goryeo (고려 현종)
Grandfather: Anjong of Goryeo (고려 안종)
Grandmother: Queen Heonjeong (헌정왕후)
Mother: Queen Wonseong (원성왕후 김씨)
Grandfather: Gim Eun-bu (김은부)
Grandmother: Grand Lady of Ansan County of the Incheon Yi clan (안산군대부인 이씨)
Consorts and their Respective Issue(s):
Queen Gyeongseong of the Gyeongju Gim clan (경성왕후 김씨); half younger sister – No issue.
Worthy Consort Gyeongmok of the Gaeseong Wang clan (경목현비 왕씨)
Princess Sanghoe (상회공주); died young.
Queen Hyosa of the Ansan Gim clan (효사왕후 김씨); half younger sister – No issue.
Lady, of the Buyeo Yi clan (부인 부여 이씨) – No issue.
Lady, of the Chungju Yu clan (부인 충주 유씨) – No issue.
Unknown
Princess Wang (공주 왕씨)

See also
List of Korean monarchs#Goryeo
List of Goryeo people

References

 

1016 births
1034 deaths
11th-century Korean monarchs
People from Kaesong